Lucile Gleason ( Webster; February 6, 1888 – May 18, 1947) was an American stage and screen actress. Gleason was also a civic worker who was active in film colony projects.

Early life
Lucile Webster was born on February 6, 1888, in Pasadena, California.

Career

Stage

Lucile Webster went on stage as a teen working with her father's stock company. After she married actor James Gleason, she realized stage success in New York City in a production of The Shannons of Broadway (1927), written by her husband. The play was adapted for a 1929 film of the same name, and was later made into the film Goodbye Broadway (1938).

Film
Gleason's motion picture career started with several movies in 1929 and continued until 1945. The Gleasons continued to perform together in Hollywood. In 1929 they co-starred in The Shannons of Broadway. In 1945, they made The Clock, with Lucile playing the role of Mrs. Al Henry, the wife of her husband's character.

Higgins Family films

Their son, Russell, was paired with his parents in the farcical family comedy, The Higgins Family, in 1938. The story centers around Lucile's performance in two radio programs which threaten to derail her husband's advertising business.  The trio was also featured in Grandpa Goes to Town, another Higgins saga, in 1940.

Activism
She was a vice-president of the Screen Actors Guild and was a member of the Hollywood U.S.O. and the Veterans' Service Council. In 1947 she was named Mother of 1947 in a Mother's Day observance conducted by the U.S.O. In the 1930s Gleason served on the advisory board of the Federal Theater Project. On several occasions she was an unsuccessful candidate for political office. In 1944 Gleason ran for the Assembly from the 59th District in California. In 1946 she was defeated by then incumbent Secretary of State Frank Jordan.

Personal life
Gleason became the wife of actor James Gleason in 1905, when the couple married in Oakland, California. She took his surname as her professional and legal surname.

Her only child was actor Russell Gleason (1908-1945), whose most prominent role came in the Academy Award-winning version of All Quiet on the Western Front (1930), in which he played the role of Private Mueller.

On December 26, 1945, Russell Gleason was in New York City when he fell to his death out of a fourth story window in the Hotel Sutton.  He had been awaiting deployment to Europe with his regiment in the hotel, which the army had commandeered to house the troops.  Reports varied, some saying the fall was accidental, while others stating it was a suicide.

Death
Gleason died in her sleep, apparently of heart disease in 1947, aged 59, at her home in Brentwood, California.

Filmography

References

Sources
 Fresno Bee, "Actress Lucile Gleason Dies In Hollywood", May 19, 1947, p. 3
 Los Angeles Times, "Lucile Gleason, Film Actress, Dies in Sleep", May 19, 1947, p. A1
 Oakland Tribune, "Gleasons Score At Grand Lake", October 28, 1938, p. 37

External links

 
 
 

1888 births
1947 deaths
20th-century American actresses
American film actresses
American stage actresses
Actresses from Pasadena, California